Leonar3Do is an integrated software and hardware platform that is capable of creating an entire three-dimensional virtual reality environment. It enables the transformation of the traditional configuration of desktop computers (or other devices) into an interactive, three-dimensional work environment. By using this virtual reality kit, the creation, manipulation, and analysis of three-dimensional objects are feasible in a real three-dimensional space. The methods, products, and applications based on the Leonar3Do platform are developed and marketed by Leonar3Do International Inc. (founded by the inventor of Leonar3Do, Daniel Rátai, in Budapest, Hungary).

About the technology and structure
The Leonar3Do has the following main hardware components:

 The so-called "bird", which is the spatial input device, This device replaces the traditional mouse, which was originally

developed for the 2D flat dimensions of desktop computers. The bird has six degrees of freedom; thanks to this feature, the user of Leonar3Do can not only grab and move the entire space or the object, but rotation is also possible.

 Three-dimensional glasses with built-in infra-LEDs which enable the detection of the eyeglasses’ position.
 The three sensors, which should be placed on the top of the display
 The central panel, which enables bi-directional communication

The three sensors' task is to track the position of both the 3D glasses and the input device (bird) and send this information to the central unit. The central unit transmits the received data to the computer and the Leonar3Do system software, which generates, manages, and displays the virtual reality environment produced by the data processed. The result is a complete 3D virtual reality environment. The user perceives the virtual object from any angle as if it were real. Leonar3Do also has a complete software development kit, which allows the development, in the generally known programming language, of new applications based on the Leonar3Do platform. With Leonar3Do's modeling software, users can give physical attributes to virtual objects like changeable mass, gravity, impeccability, and rebounding.

Versions of Leonar3Do and additional applications

Leonar3Do hardware kit
This kit contains the following components:
central panel
3D glasses
bird (the spatial input device)
the 3 sensors
AVC (Analog Video Controller)
DVC (Digital Video Controller)
Leonar3Do Software and Operating Instructions DVD
Further methods and software applications are available, based on Leonar3Do platform:

Products and industrial solutions

 Vimensio: This product was also built on the Leonar3Do platform, and its main target is primary, secondary, and higher education.

 By using Vimensio, users can create virtual reality environments, simulations or develop new 3D VR (virtual reality) applications for effective studying. Vimensio contains the abovementioned Leonar3Do hardware elements and the Vimensio educational software.
 Vimensio Edit: Gives users the ability to create their three-dimensional educational applications without the use of programming languages.
 Vimensio Play: A cross-platform application system that allows the presentation of already created three-dimensional content.

 Leonar3Do for 3D Designers and Artists: It offers an interactive and intuitive method of 3D VR modeling. This solution contains the LeoWorld and the LeoBrush software (details below); also, an Autodesk Maya plug-in has been developed for the Leonar3Do platform. Small changes can be carried out more precisely by manipulating the vertex, polygon, and face surfaces. So-called BOX MODELING character building is also feasible in the spatial space. The hardware kit is also included.
 Leopoly: Leopoly was also built on the Leonar3Do platform, and its main target is online co-creation, sculpting, and sharing 3D models.

Software applications

 Software applications require a 3D monitor and a Leonar3Do Professional Edition Kit or a Vimensio Kit, including the Leonar3Do system software and the hardware elements.
 LeoWorld: A 3D VR (virtual reality) animation and modelling software. It enables real-time polygon optimisation, lightning modification, and 3D coloring. The software forms the geometry of the object in real-time as the polygons are rearranged. Users can also give physical attributes to the 3D virtual objects like changeable mass, gravity, impeccability, and rebounding.
 LeoCapture: With the help of this software, the 3D VR work process, which has been carried out by the user, can be captured in 3D and represented (even in real-time) in the flat 2D environment without a 3D camera and 3D player. The software creates accurate video clips with the help of a traditional web camera.
 LeoConf Software: LeoConf is the multi-user version of Leonar3Do. This means that the picture, which is displayed by any Leonar3Do application, can also be projected in real time to the audience. LeoConf is suitable to create 3D demonstrations or presentations for masses of people, just like in a 3D cinema.
 LeoBrush: LeoBrush is an airbrush simulation software. The software application transforms the monitor into a canvas, and the bird can be used as a 3D airbrush. The user can save the completed creation in various file types.
 LeoGomoku: This is the 3D virtual reality version of the so-called "Tic Tac Toe" game.
 SDK Software: Application development software, which enables the development of new, Leonar3Do-based software in a C++ or OpenGL working environment. It includes the application programming interface, the sample files, the source code, and one year of developer support.
 Autodesk Maya plug-in: Leonar3Do International has developed a 3D plug-in for the Autodesk Maya software. The plug-in allows the viewing of the processed objects in real time 3D without rendering. Subtle changes can be carried out precisely by manipulating the vertex, polygon, and face surfaces. So-called BOX MODELING character building is also feasible in the spatial space.
 Unity game engine plug-in: The plug-in for the Unity game engine allows the user to develop a unique 3D VR game.
 Vimensio software: The Vimensio software has been developed for educational use. It has the aforementioned Leonar3Do features. In addition, it has an integrated application builder software, with which users are able to create their own educational content. Vimensio also offers built-in, preconstructed educational content. With the help of this software, teaching, studying, and demonstrating are made possible in a 3D virtual reality environment.

Services
Personalized services are also provided. (e.g. trainings, development support, etc.)

History of Leonar3Do
Even in his childhood, Daniel Rátai was already interested in the construction of spatial 3D drawing. He wanted to break with the 2D drawing and modelling method in which all design methods are rooted. This motivation has led to the creation of the first edition of Leonar3Do, which won him the second prize in the National High School Competition in Innovation (2004). In 2005, the Hungarian Association for Innovation asked Daniel to represent Hungary at the finals of the Intel International Science and Engineering Fair (Intel ISEF) (May 2005, Arizona, PX). Daniel Rátai and the Leonar3Do project were awarded six first prizes at the fair (details below). In the same year, Daniel founded 3D For All Ltd. (the present Leonar3Do International Inc.) as a family business. The development team and the entire company succeeded by 2010 in turning Daniel Rátai's invention into a finished 3D virtual reality product. In 2011, venture capital was invested in the business by PortfoLion, enabling the company to make further developments and to start the mass-production of the Leonar3Do virtual reality kit.

Awards
2005: International Science and Engineering Fair (Arizona, Phoenix May 2005, Intel–ISEF)
The inventor, Daniel Rátai, and his Leonar3Do project were awarded with the following six first prizes:

 First Place: IEEE Computer Society Award
 First Place: Computer Science Award—Presented by Intel Foundation
 First Place: Patent and Trademark Office (PTO) Society Award
 Best of Category: Computer Science-Presented by Intel Foundation
 The Intel Foundation Achievement Award
 Seaborg's SIYSS Award

In the same year, a planetoid was named after Daniel by the Massachusetts Institute of Technology Lincoln Laboratory. In addition, he won the György Oláh Young Scientist Award.
2008: Spring: Daniel Rátai was awarded by the Prime Minister with the Youth of March state award, for his innovative activity.
September: The Tech Award (San Jose, Tech Museum of Innovation)
In the category of education, the Leonar3Do project was awarded to be among the five most significant innovations of the world. This Tech Award was the first to be was won by a Hungarian project.
2009: Pannon Role Model Award
December: Patronage was taken over the Leonar3Do education project, by the Conference of Hungarian Rectors.
2010: The Intelius International Entrepreneurship Award was won by the Leonar3Do, at Kairos Society Global Summit, the New York Stock Exchange.
2011: February: The Man of the Year  The Hope of the Future Award (by Blikk magazine)
December: Hungarian Heritage award 
2012: Las Vegas: Leonar3Do was awarded with the "Best of CES" award, by Vanquard Marketing, at (Consumer Electronics Show ). 
In December, Leonar3Do inventor Dániel Rátai received the Docler Holding New Generation Gábor Dénes prize in the Hungarian Parliament.

References

External links
 The Verge / Ellis Hamburger: Sculpting in virtual reality: meet Leonar3Do (hands-on)

Virtual reality
Hungarian inventions